WMZQ-FM (98.7 FM) is a commercial radio station in Washington, D.C. owned by iHeartMedia. It has had a country music radio format since 1977. The studios and offices are located on Rockville Pike in Rockville, Maryland.

The transmitter is on Tower Street in Falls Church, Virginia.  WMZQ-FM has an effective radiated power (ERP) of 50,000 watts, the maximum power for radio stations in the Washington area.  It broadcasts from a tower at 149 meters (489 feet) in height above average terrain (HAAT).  With a good radio, WMZQ-FM can be heard from Baltimore, Maryland to Fredericksburg, Virginia.

WMZQ-FM broadcasts in the HD Radio format.

History
This station signed on the air on April 2, 1947 as WWDC-FM, originally on 100.9 MHz, moving to 101.1 MHz a few months later.  It was owned by the Capital Broadcasting Company with its studios at 1000 Connecticut Avenue NW.  The station originally simulcast its sister station, WWDC, then on AM 1450.

Meanwhile, WOL-FM signed on at 98.7 MHz in 1947, simulcasting its sister station, WOL 1260 kHz. In 1950, WWDC and WOL came under common ownership; that February 20, WWDC moved to the far higher-powered 1260 kHz allocation, and WOL was shifted to 1450 kHz to be resold. WWDC-FM also swapped callsigns and facilities with WOL-FM on the same day, and each simply modified their licenses to continue operating on their same frequencies. As the actual licenses were not exchanged, WMZQ-FM is the legal successor of the original WWDC-FM.

WOL-AM-FM aired a full service Rhythm and Blues format, featuring personalities, news and talk for the African-American community.  It was owned by the Peoples Broadcasting Company, relocated to the 1000 Connecticut Avenue NW studios and offices.

In 1965, WOL-AM-FM were acquired by the Sonderling Broadcasting Company.  In 1968, Sonderling switched the FM station to an Oldies format, as WMOD, while the AM continued as an R&B station.  WMOD played the rock-era hits of the 1950s and early 60s, including doo-wop music. By the mid 1970s, the format shifted to classic rock.

In 1977, Sonderling switched 98.7 to country music as WMZQ-FM. Although press reports at the time attributed the call sign as a simple abbreviation of "music", then-program director Bill Figenshu claims to have chosen it in homage to WMAQ Chicago, which was at the time a successful large-market country station. A since-repealed FCC rule also required stations to notify their competitors of a call sign change, and Figenshu suspected the "Q" – then as now, a common branding for contemporary music stations – might fool them into thinking a Top 40 format was about to launch.

The Washington market already had one FM station playing modern country, but it was based in Northern Virginia, 105.9 WXRA (today WMAL-FM) licensed to Woodbridge, Virginia.  Its signal had a hard time reaching the D.C. suburbs north of Washington, while WMZQ-FM covered the entire D.C. radio market.  The change proved a success for WMZQ-FM and the station at 105.9 eventually switched to classic rock.

Viacom acquired WMZQ-FM a few years after the switch to the country format.  In 1987 Viacom began simulcasting WMZQ-FM on AM station WMZQ in Arlington, Virginia.

In 1997, WMZQ-FM switched hands again, this time acquired by Chancellor Media.  In 2000, Chancellor was acquired by Clear Channel Communications, which a few years later became iHeartMedia, the current owner.

Past Personalities 
Previous morning / afternoon shows on WMZQ-FM include Boxer in the Morning with Aly Jacobs, Ben & Brian, Murphy & Cash, Jim London & Mary Ball, and Carol Munse. WMZQ currently airs The Bobby Bones Show, in the mornings syndicated by Premiere Networks, and based out of Nashville, Tennessee.

External links
WMZQ Website

References

IHeartMedia radio stations
MZQ-FM